The 5th New Brunswick Legislative Assembly represented New Brunswick between January 27, 1810, and 1816.

The assembly sat at the pleasure of the Governor of New Brunswick Thomas Carleton. Carleton having left the province in 1805, the colony was actually governed by a series of colonial administrators during this period.

The speaker of the house was selected as Amos Botsford. After Botsford's passing in 1813, John Robinson was appointed speaker.

History

Members

Notes

References 
Journal of the votes and proceedings of the House of Assembly of ... New-Brunswick from ... January to ... March, 1810 (1810)

05
1810 in Canada
1811 in Canada
1812 in Canada
1813 in Canada
1814 in Canada
1815 in Canada
1816 in Canada
1809 establishments in New Brunswick
1816 disestablishments in New Brunswick